Until September 1999, East Timor formed part of the Indonesian numbering plan, using the country code +62, followed by area codes for the two largest cities, Dili (390) and Baucau (399). Following the violence in the wake of Indonesia's departure from the territory, most of the telecommunications infrastructure was destroyed, and Telkom Indonesia withdrew its services from East Timor.

In the interim, the code +672, used by the Australian External Territories, was used to reach numbers in the territory. Originally, the +672 code had been allocated to the then Portuguese Timor, before its invasion and occupation in 1975.

A new country code, +670, was allocated to East Timor, but international access often remained severely limited. A complicating factor is that 670 was previously used by the Northern Marianas, with many carriers not aware that the code is now used by East Timor, and that the Northern Marianas, now part of the North American Numbering Plan, use the code 1 and the area code 670 instead, although calls to the Northern Marianas from the US are billed as calls to East Timor.

East Timor now has a closed numbering plan; all fixed line subscribers' numbers are seven digits, while mobile phone subscribers' numbers are now eight digits, with a '7' being added to the old seven-digit number.

Telephone numbering in East Timor is as follows:

Area codes in East Timor

Mobile: 73xx-xxxx ~ 78xx-xxxx
Service numbers: 721-XXXX
Government departments: 333-YYYY
Ambulance service: 110
Fire Dept: 115
Emergency: 112

References

External links
 ITU allocations list

East Timor
Communications in East Timor